Umrigar is a surname. Notable people with the surname include:

Fenil Umrigar (born 1993), Indian model and actress
Polly Umrigar (1926–2006), Indian cricketer

Indian surnames